Milad Valerikovich Alirzaev (born 13 June 1998 in Dagestan) is a Russian Greco-Roman wrestler of Rutul heritage. He is a bronze medalist at the European Wrestling Championships.

Career 

In 2019, he won the gold medal in the 82 kg event at the World U23 Wrestling Championship in Budapest, Hungary. He won the gold medal in the 82 kg event at the 2020 Individual Wrestling World Cup held in Belgrade, Serbia.

In 2021, he won one of the bronze medals in the 87 kg event at the European Wrestling Championships held in Warsaw, Poland.

Major results

References

External links 

 

Living people
1998 births
Place of birth missing (living people)
Russian male sport wrestlers
European Wrestling Championships medalists
Sportspeople from Dagestan
20th-century Russian people
21st-century Russian people